Klymentiy Sheptytsky (17 November 1869 – 1 May 1951), was an archimandrite of the Order of Studite monks of the Ukrainian Greek Catholic Church and was a hieromartyr. Klymentiy has been beatified by the Catholic Church, as well as awarded the title of Righteous Among the Nations by the State of Israel for saving Jews. As effective leader of the church, he was arrested and died a prisoner of the Soviet Union.

Early life
Sheptytsky was born as Kazimierz Maria Szeptycki on 17 November 1869 in the village of Prylbychi, Yavorich Region, near Lviv in Galicia to an old Polish-Ruthenian noble family. The Szeptycki family lived in the eastern part of Poland, near Zamość, in Labunie's Palace. At that time, the area was of the Austro-Hungarian Empire.  He was a younger brother of the future Venerable, Metropolitan Bishop Andrey Sheptytsky, and received his education first at home and starting in 1882 at Krakow.  Sheptytsky later also studied in Munich and Paris. In 1892 he became a doctor of law at the Jagiellonian University. After finishing his studies, he returned home to manage the family estates and look after his aging parents. In 1900 Casimir Sheptytsky was elected to the Austrian parliament, and a member of the National Council,  however after its dissolution in 1907 he decided to withdraw from politics.

In 1911 Sheptytsky decided to become a monk and entered the Benedictine (Latin Rite) Beuron Archabbey (Baden-Württemberg), Germany. After a year he decided to follow the example of his older brother, returning to the Ukrainian Greek Catholic Church of their ancestors and entered the Studite Monastery of St. Theodore in Bosnia. He took the religious name of Clement, after Pope Clement I, martyred in Chersonesos, who together with Andrew the Apostle is considered to be the founder of Christianity in the Balkans. In 1913 he undertook theological studies in Innsbruck and on 28 August 1915 he was ordained a priest by the Bishop of Križevci, Croatia Dionisije Njaradi, while studied. After finishing them in 1919 returned to Ukraine to settle in the Holy Dormition Lavra, currently in Lviv Raion of Lviv Oblast.

In 1926, Sheptytsky was named the hegumen (prior) of the Univ Lavra and in 1944, became the Archmandrite (abbot). In 1937 he came to Lviv to aide his ailing brother Andrew (Andrey). In 1939 the region was occupied by communists, the Soviet "liberators" immediately implemented a plan to eliminate the Ukrainian intellectual elites and church. At the time they did not arrest the Metropolitan himself, fearing his great authority among the nation, but went after his family attempting to capture Sheptytsky and murdering their brother Leon along with his family. During that time the Metropolitan divided the Soviet union into four exarchates and named Sheptytsky the exarch of Russia.

World War II

In 1941 the persecution of Christians was interrupted with the outbreak of the Nazi-Soviet war and the German occupation of Ukraine, however the situation did not improve much. During that time Sheptytsky helped his brother Andrey Sheptytsky rescue Jews, harboring them in Studite monasteries and organizing groups that would aid them in escaping to Hungarian controlled Governorate of Subcarpathia.

From 1941 to 1944, when the region was occupied by Nazi Germany, Jewish boys were hidden at the monastery in Univ, home to monks of the Ukrainian Greek Catholic Church. Univ was particularly important because it was the main Studite monastery; with its large community of monks, younger boys would go unnoticed by authorities. Along with the handful of holy men who were the children's daily caretakers, three figures were instrumental in their safekeeping: Metropolitan Andrey Sheptytsky, the head of the Ukrainian Greek Catholic Church, his brother Klymentiy, and Omelyan Kovch, a priest from the nearby town of Peremyshliany. Kurt I. Lewin, whose father was Lviv's last rabbi and who would later become a renowned businessman, and David Kahane, later chief rabbi in the Israeli Air Force, were both harbored by Sheptytsky in Lviv. Later in their lives, both men would write about their experiences, Lewin in A Journey Through Illusions and Kahane in the Lvov Ghetto Diary.

Sheptytsky was recognized as one of the Righteous among the Nations by the State of Israel in 1995.

Soviet persecution
With the return of the Soviets in 1944 a coordinated action to destroy the church and subject it to the Moscow Patriarchate was implemented. After the death of the Metropolitan, his successor, Joseph Slipyj, named Sheptytsky the Archimandrite of the Studite Order. This meant that at the time of the mass arrest of church hierarchs carried out by the NKVD in 1945 he was one of the highest ranking clergymen left. As such he became an informal leader of the church, meeting with monks and priests and strengthening them in their resolve. On 5 June 1947 he himself was arrested by Soviet authorities and held, first in an NKVD prison in Lviv, then in Kyiv, and finally, after his steadfast refusal to renounce his faith and serve the Moscow Patriarchate, sentenced to eight years imprisonment. Ivan Kryvytskyi described him: 
He died on 1 May 1951 in Vladimir Central Prison.

Veneration
Sheptytsky was beatified on 27 June 2001 by Pope John Paul II in Lviv, during his apostolic journey to Ukraine, together with 27 other members of the Ukrainian Catholic Church previously declared Venerable.

On 29 July 2011, a monument to Andrey and Klymentiy Sheptytsky was unveiled in their home village of Prylbychi.

Legacy
In November 2011, James Temerty, chairman of the Ukrainian-Jewish Encounter Initiative (UJE) donated $1.2 million to establish three endowed chairs in Jewish Studies at the Ukrainian Catholic University in Lviv, Ukraine.

A human rights activist, who served time in Soviet prisons, Myroslav Marynovych, the vice Rector of the Ukrainian Catholic University, said: We have always wanted to plunge more deeply into the legacy of previous generations of ethnic Ukrainians and Jews who lived on historically Ukrainian lands. This legacy knows not only pain and injustice, but also the experience of tolerant co-existence and mutual assistance. In order to guarantee a humane outline for the future, we must not forget the former and actively the experience the latter. For example, the spiritual inheritance of the Sheptytsky brothers alone, Andrey and Klymentiy, is sufficient to reveal to the contemporary person all the beauty of the love of humanity.

References

External links
Patron Saints Index: Blessed Clement Sheptytsky
Pastor of the 20th century
Klymentiy Sheptytsky at Yad Vashem website

1869 births
1951 deaths
People from Lviv Oblast
People from the Kingdom of Galicia and Lodomeria
Klymentiy
Ukrainian nobility
19th-century Polish nobility
Polish Austro-Hungarians
Ukrainian Austro-Hungarians
Members of the Ukrainian Greek Catholic Church
Ukrainian priests
Members of the Diet of Galicia and Lodomeria
Members of the Austrian House of Deputies (1901–1907)
Members of the Austrian House of Deputies (1907–1911)
Ukrainian politicians before 1991
Eastern Catholic beatified people
Jagiellonian University alumni
Studite Brethren
Ukrainian beatified people
Ukrainian Righteous Among the Nations
Ukrainian Christian monks
Ukrainian expatriates in Bosnia and Herzegovina
Polish anti-fascists
Catholic resistance to Nazi Germany
Eastern Catholic Righteous Among the Nations
Ukrainian anti-communists
Ukrainian people who died in Soviet detention
20th-century venerated Christians
Archimandrites
20th-century Eastern Catholic martyrs
Founders of Eastern Catholic religious communities
Ukrainian anti-fascists
20th-century Polish nobility